Beloit is an unincorporated community in Lee County, in the U.S. state of Georgia.

History
A post office called Beloit was established in 1892, and remained in operation until 1903. The community most likely was named after Beloit, Wisconsin. The Georgia General Assembly incorporated Beloit as a town in 1903. The town's charter was dissolved in 1995.

References

Former municipalities in Georgia (U.S. state)
Unincorporated communities in Lee County, Georgia
Populated places disestablished in 1995